R. V. Thomas (1899-1955) was a member of the Constituent Assembly of India and Speaker of the Travancore–Cochin Legislative Assembly. He was a prominent freedom fighter of India and noted Congress Party leader Of Kerala. He was also the first municipal chairman of Palai Municipality and was a member of the first Travancore- Cochin State Public Service Commission.

References

Year of birth missing
Year of death missing
Indian National Congress politicians from Kerala
People from Pala, Kerala
Members of the Constituent Assembly of India